Belgrade Pride is annual pride parade held in Belgrade, Serbia to celebrate the lesbian, gay, bisexual, and transgender (LGBT) people and their allies.

After the first attempt in 2001, which was faced with hooligans violence, authorities prevented further efforts to organize and register the event until 2010, when it was organized once again and faced attacks resulting in 100 injured.  In 2013 the Constitutional Court of Serbia had ruled that the 2011 ban was a violation of the constitutionally guaranteed right to freedom of assembly awarding damages to the organizers.

The third pride parade was organized in 2014 (when the first Belgrade Trans Pride was organized in parallel) without any notable incident, after which the event is organized every year, except in 2020 due to the COVID-19 pandemic. From 2016 onwards, the second pride event known as the Pride of Serbia, is organized in June to commemorate the Stonewall riots.

At the conference in Bilbao in 2019, Belgrade Pride was selected to host 2022 EuroPride in competition with ILGA Portugal, Dublin Pride and Pride Barcelona. Belgrade is the first city in the region as well as the first one outside of the European Economic Area to host the event.

On August 27, President Aleksandar Vučić announced he would not permit EuroPride to go forward, citing current tensions between Serbia and Kosovo, economic problems, and concerns that anti-gay protestors could disrupt the event. Organizers of EuroPride denounced the decision and said they would go forward with the event anyway. Vučić and the Government of Serbia then ultimately approved on 17 September that the parade could take place and an estimated 10,000 people participated in the parade walk. Incidents during the parade walk were orchestrated by opponents of Europride.

History

The first ever attempt at the organization of the event in Belgrade occurred in 2001, following the overthrow of Slobodan Milošević's regime; yet it ended up with the violent assault on the organizers and participants by sport fans and extreme right wing activists. Following the 2010 violence, the parade even was banned by the authorities citing concerns over public peace and order. At the same time, Srđan Dragojević produced influential tragicomic movie The Parade (2011) which attracted significant audience in Serbia and former Yugoslavia.

Over the years, public attitude changed with two thirds of participants of the Civil Rights Defenders research explicitly supporting the right to hold a pride parade in Belgrade.

In 2021, requests to introduce law on same-sex unions and stronger official responses to hate speech and hate crimes was the highlight of the event.

Gallery

See also
 Novi Sad Pride
 LGBT rights in Serbia
 Recognition of same-sex unions in Serbia
 LGBT history in Yugoslavia
 Sarajevo Pride
 Zagreb Pride

References

LGBT rights in Serbia
Pride parades in Serbia
Events in Belgrade